Tayirove is an urban-type settlement in Odesa Raion, Odesa Oblast (region) of southern Ukraine. It hosts the administration of Tairove settlement hromada, one of the hromadas of Ukraine. Population: 

Until 18 July 2020, Tairove belonged to Ovidiopol Raion. The raion was abolished in July 2020 as part of the administrative reform of Ukraine, which reduced the number of raions of Odesa Oblast to seven. The area of Ovidiopol Raion was split between Odesa and Bilhorod-Dnistrovskyi Raions, with Tairove being transferred to Odesa Raion.

References

External links
 Tayirove at the Verkhovna Rada of Ukraine site

Tairove Hromada
Urban-type settlements in Odesa Raion